Aha Naa Pellanta is an Indian Telugu-language romantic comedy drama web series directed by Sanjeev Reddy and produced by Surya Rahul Tamada under the Tamada Media banner. It stars Raj Tarun and Shivani Rajashekhar in lead roles, while Aamani, Harsha Vardhan, and Getup Srinu in supporting roles. Set in the backdrop of Rajamundry, the series is a comical narrative of a groom, isolated by the bride on their wedding day. The series will be released on ZEE5 on November 17, 2022.

Plot 
This eight-episode series centres on a bride who escapes with her ex-boyfriend and leaves the groom waiting in the mandap. The story unfolds when this guy decides to take revenge. The series is a humorous take on revenge and an irrational oath which changes the protagonist's fate forever.

Cast 
 Raj Tarun as Seenu
 Shivani Rajashekar as Maha
 Harsha Vardhan as No Ball Narayana, Seenu's father
 Aamani as Susheela, Seenu's mother
 Posani Krishna Murali as Mahendra, Sudha's father
 Mohammad Ali Baig as Mr. K, terrorist
 Vadlamani Srinivas as Praveen Kumar, Maha's father
 Raghu Karumanchi as C.I
 Madhunandan as Vasanth, Maha's ex-fiance and Anu's husband
 Dipali Sharma as Sudha, Seenu's ex-fiance
 Hanu Reddy as Maha's brother and Sudha's husband
 Kritika Singh as Sreeja, Seenu's childhood friend
 Thagubothu Ramesh as Barber Diwakar
 Getup Srinu as Neighbour Seenu
 Badram as Broker Perayya
 Rajkumar Kasireddy as Donga Gopal
 Ravi Siva Teja as Das, Seenu's bestfriend
 Trishool Jeethuri as Bala, Seenu's bestfriend 
 Dorababu as Murali
 Warangal Vandana as Anu, Maha's bestfriend 
 Rajsekhar Aningi as Sreeja's father
 Rakesh Rachakonda as Village Friend

Release 
In early 2022, ZEE5 announced a slate of Telugu series and films, with Aha Naa Pellanta being one of them, scheduled for a release on November 17, 2022.

The makers unveiled the first look teaser through social media platforms on 31 October 2022 and an official trailer on 4 November 2022 which begins with the introduction of Srinu’s (Raj Tarun) family. As Srinu agrees for marriage, his parents (played by Harsha Vardhan and Amani) fix the match with a girl in the same town. Later, on the wedding day, the bride escapes with her boyfriend.

The title track for Aha Naa Pellanta was released on November 5, 2022.

Home media 
The streaming rights for Aha Naa Pellanta were acquired by ZEE5.

References

External links 

 Aha Naa Pellanta on ZEE5
 

Hindi-language web series